Valentin Christian Wilhelm Sibbern (19 September 1779 – 1 January 1853) was a Norwegian government minister and representative at the Norwegian Constitutional Assembly.

Biography
Valentin Christian Wilhelm Sibbern was born on the Værne Kloster  estate at Rygge in Østfold, Norway. In 1793, he became a student at the Royal Danish Military Academy  in Copenhagen. He  was promoted to First Lieutenant in 1800 and Captain of the cavalry and commander of Rakkestadske Company in 1809. He took the  legal examination in 1802. He was promoted to Major in 1812.

In 1814, he was appointed district governor of Smaalenenes amt (now Østfold). In 1823, he was also appointed district governor of Akershus.
Between 1830 and 1852, he served in different positions within the Norwegian government including Minister of Auditing, Minister of Justice, Minister of the Army and Minister of the Navy. He was elected to the Norwegian Parliament in 1814 returning in 1815–1816, 1818, 1821–1822 and 1824.

Valentin Sibbern  represented Akershusiske ridende jegerkorps, his military regiment of the Norwegian Army, in the National Assembly at Eidsvoll  where he was a member of the independence party (Selvstendighetspartiet).

Personal life
He was married twice, with Alette Margrethe Aagaard (1776–1810) and after her death with Anne Cathrine Stockfleth (1785–1865). He was the father of musician and courtier Alette Due, and Carl Sibbern and Georg Sibbern who was Norwegian Prime Minister in Stockholm. His younger brother Henrik Frederik Arild Sibbern was also a member of the Norwegian National Assembly at Eidsvold.

Honors
Order of St. Olav 
Order of the North Star 
Order of the Sword

References

Related Reading
Holme Jørn (2014) De kom fra alle kanter – Eidsvollsmennene og deres hus  (Oslo: Cappelen Damm) 

1779 births
1853 deaths
Presidents of the Storting
Recipients of the Order of the Sword
Norwegian Army personnel
Norwegian military personnel of the Napoleonic Wars
Government ministers of Norway
Fathers of the Constitution of Norway
Ministers of Finance of Norway
Ministers of Justice of Norway
Defence ministers of Norway